Pablo Andrés Kast Sommerhoff (born 24 August 1973) is a Chilean architect and politician, member of Evópoli.  

He is the son of Miguel Kast, a Chilean economist, grandson of Michael Kast, a German immigrant to Chile.

References

External links
 Chilean National Congress Library Profile

1973 births
Living people
Chilean architects
Chilean people of German descent
Evópoli politicians
Pontifical Catholic University of Chile alumni
Kast family
21st-century Chilean politicians
Members of the Chamber of Deputies of Chile
People from Santiago